Baclaran station is an elevated Manila Light Rail Transit (LRT) station situated on Line 1. Located on the last stretches of Taft Avenue in Pasay right at the border with Baclaran, Parañaque, it is the current southern terminus of the line. The terminal is named after the famous shopping district of the same name, which is located on the borders of the cities of Pasay and Parañaque.

Baclaran is one of the four Line 1 stations serving Pasay, the others are Gil Puyat, Libertad, and EDSA. The line's depot where its trains are stored, maintained and cleaned is located near the terminal.

The terminal is near one of the country's most famous landmarks, the National Shrine of Our Mother of Perpetual Help, home of Our Mother of Perpetual Help. It is also near to the numerous dry goods and flea markets (tiangges) selling everything from clothes and electronics to home decorations and traditional medicine.

Transportation links
Baclaran Terminal is a major transportation hub, with many buses and jeepneys terminating here. Buses coming from the terminal usually head to points south of Manila and the province of Cavite. Jeepneys that terminate here usually head to various destinations in Metro Manila (Las Piñas, Parañaque, and Muntinlupa to the south; Manila, Pasay, Quezon City, and Caloocan to the north), and the province of Cavite. Cycle rickshaws can also be used to navigate the interior streets of Baclaran from the station.

Passengers can also transfer to Manila Metro Rail Transit Line 3 on its Taft Avenue station via an elevated walkway on Two Shopping Center which is the walkway is near to the proximity of the line's EDSA station.

Future
The station is set to be the transfer point for the Line 1 South Extension, also known as the South Extension Project or Cavite Extension Project which actual construction officially started on May 7, 2019 after the right-of-way of the project is "free from obstructions". The actual construction will start from Baclaran to Sucat. The line is set to extend all the way to Bacoor, Cavite with the first station south of Baclaran being Redemptorist station.

Incidents
 A fire blazed at a shopping mall in Baclaran around 5 a.m. January 3, 2008. Windy weather fanned the flames and brought smoke to the Baclaran terminal up to the next station at EDSA.

See also
List of rail transit stations in Metro Manila
Manila Light Rail Transit System

References

Manila Light Rail Transit System stations
Railway stations opened in 1984
Buildings and structures in Pasay